Stéphane Prévot is a Belgian rally co-driver.

Prévot was born in Huy. He has codriven for 74 rally drivers, including Bruno Thiry, François Duval and Chris Atkinson.

References

External links
eWRC-results.com profile

1969 births
Living people
Belgian rally co-drivers
World Rally Championship co-drivers
People from Huy
Sportspeople from Liège Province